Mahmudabad-e Gomar (also Romanized as Maḩmūdābād-e Gomār) is a village in Kushk Rural District, Abezhdan District, Andika County, Khuzestan Province, Iran. At the 2006 census, its population was 83, in 15 families.

References 

Populated places in Andika County